Nuestra Belleza Veracruz 2011, was held at the Auditorio Doctor Manuel Suárez of Córdoba, Veracruz on July 1st, 2011. At the conclusion of the final night of competition, Allin Perez of coatzacoalcoz was crowned the winner. allin was crowned by outgoing Nuestra Belleza Veracruz titleholder, Diana Botello. Six contestants competed for the state title.

Results

Placements

Judges
Miguel Pizarro - Actor
Juan Soler - Actor
Socorro Retolaza - Nuestra Belleza Veracruz 1995 & Miss Costa Maya International 1996

Contestants

References

External links
Official Website

Nuestra Belleza México